James Bishop (1625 – January 24, 1691) was an early English colonial administrator of the Colony of Connecticut.

Biography
Born in Kingston Parish, Surrey, England, Bishop came to America, arriving in Boston, Massachusetts in 1634 with his brothers Nathaniel and Henry. He was a young boy at that time and Henry was his guardian. While in Boston they became acquainted with the Rev Davenport. In 1638 they were part of the original group of settlers who settled the colony of New Haven, Connecticut. Henry worked as a farmer to Rev Davenport. It is believed that Rev Davenport tutored James, as he appeared to be much better educated than most men of that time.

Bishop married Mary Lewen and they had seven children, Hannah, Grace, Sarah, Elizabeth, Abigail, John, and Ruth. On December 12, 1665, he married his second wife, Elizabeth Tomkins, and they had four children, Samuel, Mary, James II, and Rebecca (Bishop) Thompson.

Career
Very interested in politics, Bishop became the secretary of New Haven Colony from 1651 to 1658. He was very involved in the early governments of New Haven and Connecticut colonies, serving at various times as deputy to the legislature, He was a Representative in 1665 and served seven terms until 1668.  He was assistant judge from 1668 to 1683, and sergeant in the New Haven militia. Bishop served on the Committee on Indians in 1668 and later served on the wartime council in 1673–1676 that dealt with King Philip's War.

Finally, Bishop was Lieutenant Governor of Connecticut in 1681–1683 and Deputy Governor from 1683 until his death.

Death
Bishop died in 1691. He is interred at Grove Street Cemetery in New Haven, Connecticut.

References

External links

Ancestry.com

People of colonial Connecticut
Lieutenant Governors of Connecticut
1625 births
1691 deaths